Hervé de Portzmoguer (c1470–1512), known as "Primauguet", was a Breton naval commander, renowned for his raids on the English and his death in the Battle of St. Mathieu.

Raids
Portzmoguer participated in armed convoys, protecting merchant ships from pirates and enemy warships at a time when France was often in conflict with England. He also looted foreign ships. In 1506 he was convicted of looting a Scottish ship.

From Morlaix he harassed English ships, which earned complaints from the Ambassador of England who wrote to the King of France that "more than thirty vessels" had been captured and looted by Portzmoguer. In retaliation, the troops of Admiral Edward Howard looted and burned Portzmoguer's mansion in the spring of 1512.

His motto is said to have been «War vor ha war zouar» (Breton for "On sea and on land").

Death

On 10 August 1512 he went down with his ship Marie de la Cordelière in the Battle of St. Mathieu, when it blew up in a struggle with the English ship Regent. Both ships were sunk. Almost all the crew were killed. The incident immediately became famous. The French poet-scholar Germain de Brie wrote a Latin poem which portrayed de Portzmoguer in such an ultra-heroic light that the English writer with Thomas More attacked it mercilessly. In his epigrams addressed to de Brie, More ridiculed the poem's description of "Hervé fighting indiscriminately with four weapons and a shield; perhaps the fact slipped your mind, but your reader ought to have been informed in advance that Hervé had five hands.

The explosion that killed de Portzmoguer was subsequently portrayed as a deliberate act of self-sacrificing heroism. He is supposed to have said "Nous allons fêter saint Laurent qui périt par le feu!". ("we will celebrate the feast of Saint Lawrence, who died by fire") before blowing up the ship to avoid its otherwise inevitable capture by the English. In fact there is no evidence that the explosion was intentional.

The Breton poet Théodore Botrel wrote a heroic poem about this version of the incident. An equally heroic version is portrayed Alan Simon in the song Belle Marie de la Cordelière in his rock opera Anne de Bretagne (2008).

French ships named for him
These ships in the French navy were named after him, using his gallicised nickname "Primauguet":
 , a brig
 , a steam corvette
 , a cruiser
 , a transport
 , a 

References

15th-century Breton people
Military personnel killed in action